Simpsonichthys margaritatus is a species of killifish from the family Rivulidae.
It is found in the Verde River floodplains, of the upper Paraná River basin in central Brazil in South America.

References

margaritatus
Taxa named by Wilson José Eduardo Moreira da Costa
Fish described in 2012